Tammouz may refer to:

Tammuz (deity), Babylonian and Sumerian god
Tammuz reactor, an Iraqi nuclear power plant
Tamouz (band), an Israeli band